Dixon Javier Machado Moreno (born February 22, 1992) is a Venezuelan professional baseball shortstop in the Houston Astros organization. He made his MLB debut in 2015 with the Detroit Tigers and has also played for the Chicago Cubs and San Francisco Giants, and in the KBO League for the Lotte Giants.

Career

Minor leagues 
The Detroit Tigers signed Machado as an international amateur free agent in 2008. The Tigers purchased Machado's contract after the 2012 season, adding him to their 40-man roster. He was designated for assignment on December 4, 2013, to make room on the 40-man roster for Joe Nathan. He was added to the 40-man roster again on November 20, 2014.

During the 2014 season, he hit .305/.391/.442 with five home runs and 32 RBIs, with a .965 fielding percentage in 90 games with the Double-A Erie SeaWolves. He also appeared in 41 games with the Class-A Advanced Lakeland Flying Tigers, hitting .252 with one home run and eight RBIs, with a .972 fielding percentage. Machado was named the Eastern League Player of the Month for the month of August 2014. He hit .410 (34-for-83) with six doubles, three home runs, 17 runs scored, 15 RBIs, five stolen bases, a .515 on-base percentage and a .590 slugging percentage in 25 games during the month. He ranked first among all Eastern League hitters in batting average (.410), on-base percentage (.590), and OPS (1.105), tied for second in hits (34), third in slugging percentage (.590) and walks (18).

Detroit Tigers 
The Tigers promoted Machado to the major leagues from the Triple-A Toledo Mud Hens on May 24, 2015. He made his major league debut the next day in a game against the Oakland Athletics. Prior to being called up, Machado was hitting .274 with one home run and 16 RBIs in 40 games with the Mud Hens. On May 27, Machado got his first career major league hit, a single off of Sean Doolittle of the Oakland Athletics in the sixth inning.

Machado was named to the International League's all-star team in 2015, and played in the Triple-A All-Star Game. On September 1, 2015, Machado was named to the International League post-season All-Star game. Machado was hitting .259 with 47 RBIs, 15 steals, and a .640 OPS in 124 games with the Mud Hens. His .976 fielding percentage ranked among the best for International League shortstops.

Machado was named the Venezuelan Winter League Player of Week for the week ending October 26, 2015. While playing for Leones del Caracas, Machado batted 22-for-57 (.386) with seven doubles, three home runs and 11 RBIs.

Machado spent most of 2016 with the Toledo Mud Hens, batting .266/.349/.356, receiving a promotion to Detroit in mid-August. He played in eight games for the Tigers after he was promoted.

Machado made the 2017 Opening Day roster for the Tigers. On July 6, he hit his first major league home run off Chris Stratton of the San Francisco Giants. Machado hit .259/.302/.319 in 166 at bats for the 2017 Tigers.

Machado again made the Tigers' Opening Day roster in 2018. He hit a ninth-inning walk-off home run on April 18, lifting the Tigers to a win over the Baltimore Orioles, but was designated for assignment on July 4 after batting .206/.263/.290 in 67 games with only that one home run. After clearing waivers unclaimed by any other major league team, Machado could have elected free agency but chose to accept the assignment to AAA Toledo on July 8, for whom he batted 	.225/.321/.279. He declared free agency on October 3, 2018.

Miami Marlins 
On November 29, 2018, Machado signed a minor-league contract with the Miami Marlins. He was released on March 26, 2019.

Chicago Cubs 
On March 29, 2019, Machado signed a minor league deal with the Chicago Cubs, and was assigned to AAA Iowa Cubs. With Iowa he batted 	.261/.371/.480 in 329 at bats, with a .978 fielding percentage at shortstop. He elected free agency on November 4, 2019.

Lotte Giants
On November 22, 2019, Machado signed a one-year contract with the Lotte Giants of the KBO League. On November 6, 2020, Machado re-signed with the Giants on a one-year, $650,000 deal with an option for the 2022 season. Over Machado's two years with the Lotte Giants, he played in 277 games, hitting .280/.359/.393 with 17 home runs, 125 RBIs, and 23 steals in 949 at bats, with a .982 fielding percentage at shortstop. He became a free agent following the 2021 season.

Chicago Cubs (second stint)
On December 17, 2021, Machado signed a minor league contract with the Chicago Cubs. He began the 2022 season with the Triple-A Iowa Cubs. In 2022 with Iowa, he batted .312/.402/.394 with 10 steals in 340 at bats, with a .990 fielding percentage at shortstop. He requested a trade from the organization on July 31, 2022.

San Francisco Giants
The Cubs traded Machado to the San Francisco Giants for Raynel Espinal on July 31, 2022, and the Giants promoted Machado to the major leagues to fill in for injured shortstops Brandon Crawford and Thairo Estrada. On August 6, the Giants designated Machado for assignment.

Houston Astros
On November 22, 2022, Machado signed a minor league deal with the Houston Astros with an invitation to Major League Spring Training.

See also

 List of Major League Baseball players from Venezuela

References

External links

1992 births
Living people
Connecticut Tigers players
Detroit Tigers players
Erie SeaWolves players
Gulf Coast Tigers players
Iowa Cubs players
Lakeland Flying Tigers players
Leones del Caracas players
Lotte Giants players
Major League Baseball infielders
Major League Baseball players from Venezuela
Mesa Solar Sox players
People from San Cristóbal, Táchira
Salt River Rafters players
San Francisco Giants players
Toledo Mud Hens players
Venezuelan expatriate baseball players in South Korea
Venezuelan expatriate baseball players in the United States
Venezuelan Summer League Tigers players
West Michigan Whitecaps players